Charles "Chuck" Stuart (December 18, 1959 – January 4, 1990) was an American murderer whose 1989 killing of his pregnant wife, Carol, generated national headlines. Stuart falsely alleged that Carol was shot and killed by an African-American assailant. Stuart's brother confessed to police that Stuart killed his wife to collect life insurance, and Stuart subsequently died by suicide.

Murders
In 1989, Charles Stuart was serving as the general manager for Edward F. Kakas & Sons, furriers on Newbury Street in Boston, Massachusetts. His wife, Carol (née DiMaiti, born March 26, 1959), was a tax attorney and pregnant with the couple's first child. On October 23, the couple were driving through the Roxbury neighborhood after attending childbirth classes at Brigham and Women's Hospital. According to Stuart's subsequent statement, an African-American gunman with a raspy voice forced his way into their car at a stoplight, ordered them to drive to nearby Mission Hill, robbed them, then shot Charles in the stomach and Carol in the head. Stuart then drove away and called 9-1-1 on his car phone.

On the night of the murder, the CBS reality television series Rescue 911 was riding with Boston Emergency Medical Services personnel. The crew took dramatic footage of the couple being extricated from the car: Carol can be seen "in profile, her pregnancy prominent, being wheeled to the ambulance." Other footage included Stuart straining to speak with ambulance workers, and graphic scenes of his rushed entry to the hospital's emergency room.

Carol died just hours after the shooting, at approximately 3:00 a.m. on October 24. Her funeral took place four days later at St. James Church in her hometown of Medford, Massachusetts. Shortly before her death, doctors delivered her baby by caesarean section, two months premature. Baptized in the intensive care unit, the child was given the name Christopher, according to Charles and Carol's prior wishes. Christopher had suffered trauma and oxygen deprivation during the shooting, and died seventeen days later. A private funeral service was held for Christopher on November 20, 1989. Both Carol and Christopher are buried under Carol's maiden name.

Investigation
Boston Police searched for suspects based on Stuart's description of the assailant. The Washington Post described the situation: “The city's anger seems inexhaustible. That may be because it is impossible not to feel sullied by the Stuart case. Either one was duped by a fabrication with racist overtones, or one was impotent as police focused their investigation on a succession of innocent black men.” Meanwhile, Stuart himself was hospitalized for six weeks; the severity of his injuries required two operations, and Stuart's surgeon did not suspect that the nearly fatal wounds were self-inflicted. Police found a young man, William "Willie" Bennett, who fit Stuart's description. On December 28, Stuart identified Bennett as his attacker in a lineup.

The case against Bennett abruptly collapsed on January 3, 1990, when Stuart's brother Matthew identified Charles as Carol's killer. Matthew admitted that he had driven to meet Stuart that night to help him commit what he had been told was to be an insurance fraud. Upon arrival, Matthew said that he had seen that Carol had been shot and that his brother had shot himself to make it appear as a carjacking. Matthew took the gun and a bag of valuables, including the couple's wedding rings, and threw them off the Pines River Bridge in Revere. Some of the items, including the gun, were later recovered.

As Stuart had blamed the incident on an African-American male, and the information provided by his brother led the police to conclude this was not true, racial tensions were heightened in Boston for a time. Boston Police officers conducted much of their manhunt for the alleged suspect using indiscriminate stop and frisk tactics on young black men, worsening tensions and creating an atmosphere some residents compared to a war zone.

Possible motives
Police later learned that Stuart had been upset at the prospect of becoming a father, particularly worried that his wife would not go back to work and their financial status would be diminished. Stuart had also started some sort of relationship with Deborah Allen, an employee at Kakas & Sons, though Allen denied any romantic involvement. The Boston Globe reported that a $480,000 check was issued to Stuart in payment for a life insurance policy on his wife, but no such check was ever found. The television show Cold Blood reported and confirmed that Stuart received a $100,000 life insurance check which he cashed just after being discharged from the hospital. On January 7, 1990, The New York Times reported that Suffolk County Assistant District Attorney Paul K. Leary stated that a life insurance policy valued at about $83,000, held by Carol and naming her husband as beneficiary, was cashed and gold jewelry and a clock valued at about $950 was purchased by Stuart days before his suicide. Stuart also bought a new Nissan Maxima for $16,000 in cash.

Suicide
On January 4, 1990, hours after his brother, Matthew, revealed the truth to police, Stuart met with his lawyer. Shortly afterward, Stuart's car was found abandoned on the Tobin Bridge in Chelsea. A note was found in his car, stating that he was "beaten" by the "new accusations" and was "sapped of [his] strength." Stuart then apparently jumped to his death off the bridge; his body was found in the Mystic River the next day.

Investigators later learned from several relatives and friends that Stuart had previously expressed a desire to kill his wife, well before the October shooting. Several of Stuart's three brothers and sisters had known about his involvement in the killing before Matthew went to the police on January 3.

In 1991, Matthew was indicted for obstruction of justice and insurance fraud for his role in covering up the crime. An associate of Matthew, John McMahon, was also indicted as an accessory to murder. Matthew pleaded guilty in 1992 and was sentenced to three to five years in prison. He was released on parole in 1997, and was later rearrested for drug trafficking but ultimately released again after his case was appealed. On September 3, 2011, Matthew was found dead in Heading Home, a homeless shelter in Cambridge.

Memorial fund
In Carol DiMaiti's memory, her family established the Carol DiMaiti Stuart Foundation to provide scholarship aid to Mission Hill residents and Malden High School graduates. This foundation looks to help students from Mission Hill and Malden who show leadership ability, but would not be able to afford to go to college without significant additional help. This foundation provides its grantees with mentors and helps them obtain appropriate summer internships. One of the beneficiaries is the daughter of William Bennett, the man falsely accused of Carol's murder. By early 2006, the foundation had awarded $1.2 million to 220 students. The DiMaitis' attorney, Marvin Geller, explained to the press: "Carol would not want to be remembered as the victim of a sensational murder, but rather as a woman who left behind a legacy of healing and compassion."

In popular culture
The Law & Order episodes "Happily Ever After" and "Gaijin" are based on the Charles Stuart case. In "Happily Ever After", there are two apparent references to the initial suspect, Willie Bennett. David Brisbin plays Dr. Bennett and Kelly Neal appears as Willie Tivnan.

The 1990 made-for-television film Goodnight Sweet Wife: A Murder in Boston is based on this case. Charles Stuart is played by Ken Olin and Carol Stuart is played by Annabella Price.

The song "Wildside" by Marky Mark And The Funky Bunch refers to the case.

American poet, Cornelius Eady, ends his poem  with a summary of this case. 

The documentary TV series City Confidential covered the Stuart murder in its episode titled Boston: Betrayal in Beantown, originally aired on December 19, 2000.

The 2019 TV series City on a Hill opens with a title describing the murder and frame-up, as context for the setting for the racially polarized content of the series.

The 2020 Netflix Documentary series Trial 4 episode number 2, "The Usual Suspects," features a segment about the Charles Stuart case as an example of wrongful arrests and police racism toward African-Americans in the late 1980s.

Martín Espada alludes to the case in his 2018 poem "Jumping Off the Mystic Tobin Bridge."

See also

 Jesse Anderson
 Racial hoax
 Federico murder case
 Bowling for Columbine

References

Further reading
 Sharkey, Joe (1991). Deadly Greed: The Riveting True Story of the Stuart Murder Case That Rocked Boston and Shocked the Nation. Simon & Schuster. .

External links
 The forgotten victim
 Bizarro Boston
 Illusion and tragedy coexist after a couple dies, New York Times, January 7, 1990
 

1959 births
1989 hoaxes
1989 murders in the United States
1990 suicides
20th-century American criminals
American male criminals
American murderers
Crimes in Massachusetts
Criminals from Massachusetts
Death hoaxes
Filicides in the United States
History of racism in Massachusetts
Hoaxes in the United States
Murder in Massachusetts
Murderers for life insurance money
Racial hoaxes
Suicides by drowning in the United States
Suicides in Massachusetts
Uxoricides